The 1968 Tulsa Golden Hurricane football team represented the University of Tulsa during the 1968 NCAA University Division football season. In their eighth year under head coach Glenn Dobbs, the Golden Hurricane compiled a 3–7 record, 2–3 against conference opponents, and finished in fifth place in the Missouri Valley Conference.

The team's statistical leaders included Mike Stripling with 1,968 passing yards and 307 rushing yards and Harry Wood with 988 receiving yards. 

The most notable member of this team was middle linebacker Phillip "Dr. Phil" McGraw.

Schedule

References

Tulsa
Tulsa Golden Hurricane football seasons
Tulsa Golden Hurricane football